Vicent Barnabas (born 17 January 1985) is a retired Tanzanian football striker.

References

1985 births
Living people
Tanzanian footballers
Tanzania international footballers
Kagera Sugar F.C. players
Young Africans S.C. players
African Lyon F.C. players
Mtibwa Sugar F.C. players
Association football forwards
Tanzanian Premier League players